Note: This ship should not be confused with the motorboat Alameda, considered for World War I service as , but also never acquired or commissioned.

USS Alameda (ID-1432) was the proposed designation for a steamship that never actually served in the United States Navy.

Alameda was an iron-hulled passenger liner built in 1883 by the William Cramp & Sons at Philadelphia for the Oceanic Steamship Company. After the ship was completed in July 1883, 18-year-old Maggie Cramp, daughter of Joseph Cramp, played the piano at a reception; while disembarking, she slipped on the gangplank and drowned. The Alaska Steamship Company bought her in 1910.

After the USA entered World War I in 1917, the US Navy's 13th Naval District inspected her for possible naval service, and she was registered accordingly with the Naval Registry Identification Number (ID. No.) 1432. However, the Navy appears never to have acquired or commissioned her.

Alameda remained in commercial use until she caught fire at a pier in Seattle on 28 November 1931. She was subsequently scrapped.

See also
, sister ship

References

NavSource Online: Section Patrol Craft Photo Archive Alameda (ID 1432)

1883 ships
Cancelled ships of the United States Navy
Passenger ships of the United States
Steamships of the United States
World War I passenger ships of the United States
Ships built by William Cramp & Sons